The Darjeeling Limited: Original Soundtrack is the soundtrack album for the Wes Anderson film, The Darjeeling Limited. The album features three songs by The Kinks, "Powerman", "Strangers" and "This Time Tomorrow", all from the 1970 album Lola versus Powerman and the Moneygoround, Part One, as well as "Play With Fire" by The Rolling Stones. Most of the album, however, features film score music composed by Bengali filmmaker Satyajit Ray and other artists from the cinema of India. The works include "Charu's Theme", from Ray's 1964 film, Charulata.

The film is the first of Anderson's not to feature music by Mark Mothersbaugh. The Darjeeling Limited is the first Wes Anderson soundtrack album to feature a song by The Rolling Stones (though Bottle Rocket, Rushmore, and The Royal Tenenbaums all featured Rolling Stones songs, contractual reasons prevented the songs from appearing on the soundtrack albums).

Track listing

References

Comedy-drama film soundtracks
2007 soundtrack albums